I'll Take Care of Your Cares is a studio album by Frankie Laine released in 1967 on ABC Records.

Track listing

Charts

References 

1967 albums
Frankie Laine albums
ABC Records albums